Kurdkulag may refer to:
Boloraberd, Armenia
Ghurdghulagh, Armenia